Kjell Åkerstrøm Hansen Rodian (30 June 1942 – 29 December 2007) was a Danish cyclist who won an individual silver medal in the road race at the 1964 Olympics. After that he semi-retired for nine years, and after returning to cycling rode the Peace Race in 1973–75. He also placed second-third at the national championships in 1974, both on the road and on track.

References

External links

 

1942 births
2007 deaths
Danish male cyclists
Olympic cyclists of Denmark
Olympic silver medalists for Denmark
Cyclists at the 1964 Summer Olympics
Olympic medalists in cycling
Sportspeople from Frederiksberg
Medalists at the 1964 Summer Olympics